William Mountfort (c. 1664 – 10 December 1692), English actor and dramatic writer, was the son of a Staffordshire gentleman.

Biography

His first stage appearance was with the Dorset Garden Theatre company about 1678, and by 1682 he was taking important parts, usually those of the fine gentleman. Mountfort wrote a number of plays, wholly or in part, and many prologues and epilogues. In 1686 he married the actress Susanna Percival.

Owing to jealousy of Mrs. Anne Bracegirdle's supposed interest in Mountfort, Captain Richard Hill, an adventurer, who had annoyed her with persistent attentions, accompanied by Charles Mohun, 4th Baron Mohun ambushed Mountfort in Howard Street, Strand, on 9 December 1692. During the struggle Mountfort was stabbed in the chest by Hill, and he died of his wounds the following day. Following the attack Hill fled to France. Lord Mohun was tried by his peers and acquitted by a vote of 69 to 14.

The bell of St Clement's Church is reputed to have cracked when tolled at Mountfort's funeral. His daughter Susanna Mountfort became an actor at Drury Lane.

Works
An anthology of his plays, entitled Six Plays, was  published by J. Tonson, G. Strahan and William Mears in two volumes (1719-20) accompanied by a preface consisting of some memoirs of his life. The plays were:
 The Injured Lovers (1688)
 The Successful Strangers (1690)
 Greenwich Park (1691)
 King Edward the Third , with the Fall of Mortimer Earl of March (generally attributed to John Bancroft)
 The life and death of Dr. Faustus
 Henry the Second, King of England, with the Death of Rosamond (1692) (also attributed to John Bancroft)
It is believed that his 1705 play Zelmane: Or, The Corinthian Queen: A Tragedy. As it is Acted at the New-theatre in Lincolns-Inn-Fields has the first appearance of the expression, "Be still my beating heart."

References

Attribution

External links
 
 
 

1664 births
1692 deaths
English male stage actors
17th-century English dramatists and playwrights
17th-century English male actors
People murdered in Westminster
English murder victims
English male dramatists and playwrights
Deaths by stabbing in London
Male murder victims